The World Single Distances Speed Skating Championships are a series of speed skating competitions organised by the International Skating Union.
The World Single Distances Speed Skating Championships for Men was introduced, also by ISU, in 1996, and has been occurring annually ever since.

Locations
 1996: Hamar, Norway
 1997: Warsaw, Poland
 1998: Calgary, Canada
 1999: Heerenveen, Netherlands
 2000: Nagano, Japan
 2001: Salt Lake City, United States
 2002 Not held because of the Winter Olympic Games
 2003: Berlin, Germany
 2004: Seoul, South Korea
 2005: Inzell, Germany
 2006 Not held because of the Winter Olympic Games
 2007: Salt Lake City, United States
 2008: Nagano, Japan
 2009: Vancouver, Canada
 2010 Not held because of the Winter Olympic Games
 2011: Inzell, Germany
 2012: Heerenveen, Netherlands
 2013: Sochi, Russia
 2014 Not held because of the Winter Olympic Games
 2015: Heerenveen, Netherlands
 2016: Kolomna, Russia
 2017: Gangneung, South Korea
 2018 Not held because of the Winter Olympic Games
 2019: Inzell, Germany
 2020: Salt Lake City, United States
 2021: Heerenveen, Netherlands
 2022 Not held because of the Winter Olympic Games
 2023: Heerenveen, Netherlands

Medal winners
Numbers in brackets denotes number of victories in corresponding disciplines. Boldface denotes record number of victories.

500 m

Source: schaatsstatistieken.nl 

Medal table

1,000 m

Source: schaatsstatistieken.nl 

Medal table

1,500 m

Source: schaatsstatistieken.nl 

Medal table

5,000 m

Source: schaatsstatistieken.nl 

Medal table

10,000 m

Source: schaatsstatistieken.nl 

Medal table

Mass start

Source: schaatsstatistieken.nl 

Medal table

Team pursuit

Source: schaatsstatistieken.nl 

Medal table

Team sprint

Source: schaatsstatistieken.nl 

Medal table

Medal summary
Updated after the 2023 World Championships.

Nations

World champions

Silver medalists

Bronze medalists

References

Single